Oedopa elegans is a species of ulidiid or picture-winged fly in the genus Oedopa of the family Ulidiidae.

Distribution
Mexico.

References

Ulidiidae
Insects described in 1893
Taxa named by Ermanno Giglio-Tos
Diptera of North America
Endemic insects of Mexico